A Band of Boys also known as (ABOB) is an Indian Hindi boy band, best known for their eponymous album A Band of Boys in 2002 and their movie Kiss Kisko in 2004. The band was formed in 2001, and the original line up consisted of Karan Oberoi, Siddharth Haldipur, Sherrin Varghese, Chintoo Bhosle and Sudhanshu Pandey; before Pandey and Siddharth consequently left the group. 

After a period of hiatus, the band announced plans to re-form in 2018 with the remaining 3 members and added a new 4th member to the band whose name is Danny Fernandes.

References

Indian boy bands